Virginia's 88th House of Delegates district elects one of 100 seats in the Virginia House of Delegates, the lower house of the state's bicameral legislature. District 88 covers part of Fauquier County, Spotsylvania County, Stafford County, and part of the city of Fredericksburg, Virginia.
This district is currently represented by Republican Phillip Scott.

District officeholders

Results

References

Fauquier County, Virginia
Spotsylvania County, Virginia
Stafford County, Virginia
Fredericksburg, Virginia
Virginia House of Delegates districts